This page provides supplementary chemical data on ammonia.

Structure and properties

Thermodynamic properties

Vapor–liquid equilibrium data

Table data (above) obtained from CRC Handbook of Chemistry and Physics 44th ed. The (s) notation indicates equilibrium temperature of vapor over solid. Otherwise temperature is equilibrium of vapor over liquid.

Vapor-pressure formula for ammonia:

 log10P = A – B / (T − C),

where P is pressure in kPa, and T is temperature in kelvins;

 A = 6.67956, B = 1002.711, C = 25.215 for T = 190 K through 333 K.

Heat capacity of liquid and vapor

Spectral data

Regulatory data

Safety data sheet

The handling of this chemical may incur notable safety precautions... It is highly recommend that you seek the Safety Data Sheet (SDS) for this chemical from a reliable source and follow its directions.
SIRI
Science Stuff (Ammonia Solution)

References

External links
Phase diagram for ammonia
IR spectrum (from NIST)

Chemical data pages
Chemical data pages cleanup